Forest Peoples Programme (FPP) advocates an alternative vision of how forests should be managed and controlled, based on respect for the rights of the peoples who know them best. FPP works with forest peoples in South America, Africa, and Asia, to help them secure their rights, build up their own organisations and negotiate with governments and companies as to how economic development and conservation are best achieved on their lands.

Forests cover 31% of total land area of the planet. Of that, 12% are designated for the conservation of biological diversity and nearly all are inhabited. Many of the peoples, who live in and have customary rights to their forests, have developed ways of life and traditional knowledge that are attuned to their forest environments. Yet, forest policies commonly treat forests as empty lands controlled by the state and available for ‘development’ – colonisation, logging, plantations, dams, mines, oil wells, gas pipelines and agribusiness. These encroachments often force forest peoples out of their forest homes. Many conservation schemes to establish wilderness reserves also deny forest peoples’ rights.

History
Forest Peoples Programme (FPP) was founded in 1990 in response to the forest crisis, specifically to support indigenous forest peoples’ struggles to defend their lands and livelihoods. It registered as a non-governmental human rights Dutch Stichting in 1997, and then later, in 2000, as a UK charity, No. 1082158 and a company limited by guarantee (England & Wales) Reg. No. 3868836, with a registered office in the UK.

FPP's focus, in the beginning, came from the expertise and relationships that the small founding team had with specific communities, primarily in the Guyanas and in South and South East Asia. Forest Peoples Programme has grown into a respected and successful organisation that now operates right around the tropical forest belt where it serves to bridge the gap between policy makers and forest peoples. Through advocacy, practical projects and capacity building, FPP supports forest peoples to deal directly with the outside powers, regionally, nationally, and internationally that shape their lives and futures. Forest Peoples Programme has contributed to, and continues supporting, the growing indigenous peoples' movement whose voice is gaining influence and attention on the world-wide stage.

Publications
Forest Peoples Programme produces a wide range of publications, including reports, briefings, training manuals, papers, submissions to human rights bodies, statements, letters, urgent action requests, as well as news articles.

See also
FERN
World Rainforest Movement
Indigenous rights
UNFCCC
Declaration on the Rights of Indigenous Peoples

References

External links
Official website
Forest Peoples Programme at UK Central Register of Charities

Indigenous rights
Organizations established in 1990
Environmental organisations based in the United Kingdom
Indigenous rights organizations
Charities based in Gloucestershire
International forestry organizations
Forest conservation organizations